Washington ratified its constitution and held its first state elections in 1889, the year it was admitted to the union as a state. It established the positions of governor, lieutenant governor, Secretary of State, attorney general, state treasurer, state auditor, Commissioner of Public Lands, and Superintendent of Public Instruction. The position of insurance commissioner was legislatively established in 1907. All positions are elected to four-year terms, concurrent with presidential elections. Washington is one of three states that elects nine separate statewide officials, while six others elect ten. 

The table also indicates the historical party composition in the State Senate, State House of Representatives, State delegation to the U.S. Senate, and State delegation to the U.S. House of Representatives. State senators are elected to four-year terms, with half elected every two years. State representatives are elected to two-year terms, and two from each of 49 legislative districts in separate elections. 

While the U.S. state of Washington is considered a solidly Democratic state, it mainly elected Republican candidates during its first forty years of statehood. It currently holds the longest streak of Democratic governors in the nation, having last elected a Republican to the top executive office in 1980. The office of auditor has been held continuously by Democrats since 1933, when the national wave for President Franklin Roosevelt swept the party into every statewide race and congressional district except the uncontested office of superintendent of public instruction. That position was made nonpartisan in 1940. At the presidential level, Washington is part of the "blue wall", having voted for all Democratic nominees since 1988. 

Prior to statehood, the President of the United States appointed a territorial governor and secretary of state, who served as acting governor when the governor was absent from the state. The position of attorney general was established in 1887, and only one person held office before statehood. A non-voting delegate was elected to the House of Representatives.

The nine members of the Washington Supreme Court are also elected statewide to six-year terms but on a nonpartisan basis and are not listed here. However all members of the court are considered liberal-leaning, matching the state's overall electorate.

Voters do not register as members of political parties. 

The tables below show the history of officeholders elected to statewide executive offices, the state legislature, and the U.S. Congress, as well as the winners of the state's electoral college votes.

For years in which a presidential election was held, the table indicates which party's nominees received the state's electoral votes.

Washington Territory
The first territorial superintendent of public education was elected by the legislature in 1861 to a three-year term, but the position was disestablished after just one year. It was reestablished in 1871, elected by the legislature to a two-year term. The superintendent was chair of the governor-appointed board of education, which met in the hometown of the superintendent in several cities around the state until statehood when the office remained in Olympia.

State of Washington 
At statehood, the constitution established eight positions that would be elected statewide. The officials take office in the January following their election. The insurance commissioner was first elected in 1908.

See also 

Politics in Washington
Elections in Washington

References

External links 

State of Washington  – Members of the Legislature 1889–2011
History of the Washington Legislature 1854–1963

Government of Washington (state)
Washington (state)